This is a list of presidents of the Council of Kumanovo Municipality.

Presidents 

 This list is not complete

See also
Mayor of Kumanovo
List of mayors of Kumanovo

References

Kumanovo
Kumanovo Municipality
Lists of political people
North Macedonia politics-related lists